South Lake Sports Center is a multi-purpose stadium in Zigong, China.  It is currently used mostly for football matches.  The stadium holds 20,000 spectators.  It was opened on August 9, 2010. It was used as the main venue for the 2010 Sichuan Provincial Games.

References

Football venues in China
Multi-purpose stadiums in China
Sports venues in Sichuan